Thomas Disney (c. 1510 – 17 April 1568), of Carlton-le-Moorland, Lincolnshire, was an English politician.

He was a Member (MP) of the Parliament of England for Boroughbridge in 1563.

References

1510 births
1568 deaths
English MPs 1563–1567
People from North Kesteven District